Shivaji College is located in Karwar town, India, 5 km from the city centre in the Baad Nandangadda area. It has a playing ground and buildings. It is a private college affiliated with Karnataka University. It is maintained and run by the Shivaji Education Society.

Academics 
The college consists of:
 Pre-university college (Std. 11 to Std. 12)
 Graduate school (degree)

The degree section is headed by Mr A G Kerlekar.

Departments 
The departments run under governing Heads. The following are the departments of the college:-
 PreUniversity Department- consisting of separate sessions for pre-university Commerce, Arts and Science
 Degree Department
 Bachelor of Computer Application (BCA) 
 Bachelor of Education (B.Ed) and (D.Ed)
 Bachelor of Arts (BA)
 Bachelor of commerce (Bcom)

Features 
 Hall where student theatrical and musical productions can be staged and where all-college events are held.
 Office where the administrative work of the college is done.
 Library  
 Classrooms including laboratories for science education.
 Computer labs where computer-based work is done and the internet accessed.
 Playground for sports like cricket, football and volleyball.

Activities 
The college arranges activities like dance competition and quiz competitions. It celebrates Hindu pooja like Saraswati Pooja. It takes part in cluster, district, regional, divisional and state level competitions.

See also 
 Education in india
 Shivaji

References 

http://www.scebaadkarwar.org/

Colleges in Karnataka
Education in Karwar
Monuments and memorials to Shivaji
Karnatak University